Kiviapaja is a small village in Savonlinna, Finland, near Sulkava. It was part of the municipality of Sääminki until 1973.

Famous people
 Heikki Silvennoinen, actor and musician
 Arto Tiainen, skier

Savonlinna